Wyonycteris is a genus of small mammals that existed in the late Paleocene and early Eocene epochs. The type species is Wyonycteris chalix, which lived in Wyoming during the Clarkforkian North American Land Mammal Age of the Paleocene and was originally proposed to be an early form of insectivorous bat. Later re-examination of the material has put this alliance in doubt, and the genus has instead been proposed as belonging to the subfamily Placentidentinae, within the family Nyctitheriidae. Similar fossil material of the same time period found in Europe was later discovered and described as new species, Wyonycteris richardi.

Secord (2008) described the first known species of Wyonycteris from the Tiffanian NALMA, Wyonycteris galensis and W. microtis, although the status of both species as members of Wyonycteris has been questioned. The two largest species, W. primitivus and W. kingi, are known from the early Eocene of Mississippi and England, respectively.

Evolutionary relationships 
Wyonycteris is only known from dental remains. It is characterized by W-shaped crests on the outer side of the upper molars, a trait that it shares with most insectivorous bats. However, Wyonycteris possesses a number of additional cusps on the upper molars that are not present in bats leading many researchers to conclude that it is more closely related to the extinct insectivorous family Nyctitheriidae. A recent phylogenetic analysis found most species of Wyonycteris to be within the family Nyctitheriidae, most closely related to the genus Pontifactor. Wyonycteris microtis was found to be very distantly related to the other species of Wyonycteris and outside the family Nyctitheriidae.

Rose et al. (2012) compared Wyonycteris to the genus Plagioctenoides and concluded that the two may in fact belong to the same genus. If this is the case, the correct genus name would be Plagioctenoides since it was formally named first.

Distribution 
Paleocene
 Tiffanian
 Polecat Bench Formation, Wyoming
 Clarkforkian
 Willwood Formation, Wyoming

Eocene
 Tienen Formation, Belgium
 Woolwich and Blackheath Beds Formations, England
 Argiles d'lignite du Soissonnais Formation, France
 Wasatchian
 Tuscahoma Formation, Mississippi
 Wasatch and Willwood Formations, Wyoming

References 

Eulipotyphla
Soricomorphs
Thanetian life
Ypresian life
Prehistoric mammal genera
Eocene mammals of Europe
Paleocene mammals of Europe
Paleogene Belgium
Fossils of Belgium
Paleogene England
Fossils of England
Paleogene France
Fossils of France
Eocene mammals of North America
Paleocene mammals of North America
Clarkforkian
Tiffanian
Wasatchian
Fossils of the United States
Paleogene Mississippi
Paleontology in Mississippi
Paleontology in Wyoming
Fossil taxa described in 2008